The Hundred of Pichi Richi is a cadastral hundred of the County of Newcastle in South Australia,  and  above sea level. It spans the eastern slopes of Dutchman Range and is centred on the township of Quorn.

The traditional owners of the area are the Ngadjuri people. The first European explorer to the area was Thomas Burr in September 1842.

See also
Pichi Richi Railway

References

Pichi Richi